Three ships of the Royal Navy have been named HMS Gosport, after the Hampshire town of Gosport, located close to the naval base at Portsmouth:

  was a 32-gun fifth rate launched in 1696. She was captured by the French in 1706.
  was a 44-gun fifth rate launched in 1707 and broken up in 1735.
  was a 44-gun fifth rate launched in 1741 and broken up by 1768.

Royal Navy ship names